Chaunté Lowe (née Howard; born January 12, 1984) is an American athlete who competes in the high jump. A four-time Olympian (2004, 2008, 2012 and 2016), she is the 2008 Olympic bronze medalist, the 2005 World Championship silver medalist and the 2012 World Indoor  gold medalist. She initially finished sixth in the 2008 Olympic high jump final, but was promoted to the bronze medal in 2016 after three competitors were disqualified for doping. She is the American record holder in the women's high jump with an outdoor clearance of 2.05 m in 2010, and holds the indoor record with a clearance of 2.02 m in 2012.

Career

Early career
Lowe graduated from John W. North High School in Riverside, California, where she won the National Scholastic Indoor Championships twice. She won the 2001 CIF California State Meet in the high jump and finished second in 2002 in the high jump, long jump and triple jump, leading her team to the state team championships. Among her first successes was a high jump bronze medal at the 2003 Pan American Junior Athletics Championships.

2004 Summer Olympics
Lowe jumped 1.85 m in the qualifying round of the women's high jump at the 2004 Summer Olympics and did not reach the final.

2005 IAAF World Championships
In the qualifying round, Lowe tied with Iryna Mykhalchenko for second in her group with a height of 1.93 m. In the final, Lowe placed second behind Kajsa Bergqvist, who jumped 2.02 m, with a height of 2.00 m.

2008 Summer Olympics
Lowe jumped 1.93 m in the qualifying round at the 2008 Summer Olympics to reach the final. She initially placed sixth in the high jump final with a height of 1.99 m. In late 2016, the International Olympic Committee stripped Russians Anna Chicherova and Yelena Slesarenko and Ukrainian Vita Palamar of their placements ahead of Lowe due to positive tests for banned drugs, resulting in Lowe being awarded the bronze medal for the event.

2009-2010

Competing in 2009, she became the national champion with a clearance of 1.95 m at the 2009 USA Outdoor Track and Field Championships, beating Amy Acuff to the title on countback. This gained her qualification into the 2009 World Championships in Athletics: she reached the 2009 high jump final, but she could not repeat her past medal performance and finished in seventh place. She closed the year with a fourth-place finish at the last edition of the World Athletics Final.

Lowe improved her indoor best with a jump of 1.98 m at the USA Indoor Track and Field Championships in 2010. She attempted to tie with Tisha Waller's record, but just knocked the bar at the last moment. At the 2010 IAAF World Indoor Championships, she won a bronze medal in the high jump with a clearance of 1.98 m.

On May 30, 2010, Lowe broke Louise Ritter's American record of 2.03 m set in 1988 with a clearance of 2.04 m in Cottbus, Germany. Less than a month later, On June 26, 2010, Lowe improved her record with a clearance of 2.05 m in Des Moines, IA.

2012

Lowe capped a successful 2012 Indoor season by winning the USA Indoor Championship at Albuquerque, NM, on February 26, with a new national record of 2.02m (6' 7.50"): That broke the American indoor, and Championship meet, mark of 2.01 (6' 7.25") established at the 1998 USA Indoor Championship meet by Tisha Waller. Lowe won the competition as the only jumper to clear 1.93 (6'4"), then went on to clear 1.96, 1.99, scaled 2.02 on her third attempt, and made three attempts at 2.04. She set a meet record at the Drake Relays in April with a jump of 1.98 m. On March 10, she topped this successful indoor season by becoming World Indoor Champion at the IAAF World Indoor Championships on in Istanbul being the only one to clear 1.98 m.

At the Summer Olympics, she again reached the final and again finished in 6th place, a result she found disappointing because she was one of the favourites.

2014
Back from pregnancy for the 3rd time in 2013, Lowe was the runner-up in the high jump in 1.94 meters at 2014 USA Outdoor Track and Field Championships but then was awarded as the winner because Inika McPherson was disqualified for doping. At the 2014 IAAF Continental Cup, Lowe took 2nd place behind Mariya Kuchina (1.99 m) in a season's best of 1.97 m.
Lowe won the high jump in 1.91 meters at 2015 USA Outdoor Track and Field Championships. Her results were less great as the other years because she needed to help her second daughter who suffers of autism. She participated at the World championships but failed to clear the first bar at 1.80 m.

2016 : back to the top 
During the indoor season, Lowe came back to the great heights and cleared a season's best at 1.95 m in Albuquerque. She finished 3rd at the US Indoor Championships with a 1.93 meters' clearance.

Back outdoors, she jumped a WL of 1.93 m in February, then won the Ibero-American title with a 1.96 m clearance. On July 3, she qualifies for her 4th Olympic team by winning the 2016 Olympic Trials with 2.01 m, tying her own trials record.

Personal life
She took a year off from competition in 2007 and gave birth to her daughter, Jasmine. Another daughter was born in April 2011. She is married to Mario Lowe, a triple jumper. She graduated from Georgia Institute of Technology in May 2008.

She is currently attending Western Governors University for her master's degree.

In 2019 she was diagnosed with triple negative breast cancer, a cancer that affects women of West African ancestry at high rates. She underwent a double mastectomy and chemotherapy to treat the disease.  She was awarded the NCAA Inspiration Award in 2021 for continuing to share her story in order to raise awareness and provide hope for others.

Personal bests

Key: AR = Area record, NR = National record

International competitions
All results regarding high jump

See also
Female two metres club

References

External links

 
 

1984 births
Living people
American female high jumpers
Athletes (track and field) at the 2004 Summer Olympics
Athletes (track and field) at the 2008 Summer Olympics
African-American female track and field athletes
Athletes (track and field) at the 2012 Summer Olympics
Athletes (track and field) at the 2016 Summer Olympics
Georgia Tech Yellow Jackets women's track and field athletes
World Athletics Championships medalists
Track and field athletes from California
World Athletics Championships athletes for the United States
Medalists at the 2008 Summer Olympics
Olympic bronze medalists for the United States in track and field
Western Governors University alumni
Diamond League winners
USA Outdoor Track and Field Championships winners
USA Indoor Track and Field Championships winners
World Athletics Indoor Championships winners
21st-century African-American sportspeople
21st-century African-American women
20th-century African-American people
20th-century African-American women